Haddock is a surname of English. It may refer to many people.

It may come from the medieval word Ædduc, a diminutive of Æddi, a short form of various compound names including the root ēad, meaning prosperity or fortune.

It may also refer to someone who comes from Haydock, a town near Liverpool. "Haydock" probably comes from the Welsh word heiddog, meaning "characterized by barley".

It may also come from Middle English hadduc, referring to someone who worked as a fisherman or a fish seller, or who looked like a fish.

A
Andy Haddock (born 1946), Scottish former footballer
Austin Mitchell (born 1934), briefly named Austin Haddock, a British Member of Parliament

C
Charles Brickett Haddock (1796–1861), New Hampshire educator and politician
Chris Haddock, Canadian screenwriter and producer

D
Doris Haddock (1910–2010), politician and liberal political activist from New Hampshire

E
Eric John Haddock, birth name of Eric Haydock (1943–2019), original bass guitarist of the band The Hollies
Edward E. Haddock (1911–1996), American physician and politician

F
Francis Oliver Haddock (1892–1934), police officer killed in the line of duty
Frank Channing Haddock (1853–1915), American New Thought and self-help author

G
George Haddock (baseball) (1866–1926), American Major League baseball pitcher
George Haddock (politician) (1863–1930), British Conservative member of Parliament
Gray Haddock (born 1982), American actor and film producer

H
Harry Haddock (1925–1998), Scottish footballer
Herbert Haddock (1861–1946), captain of the RMS Olympic

J
Julie Anne Haddock (born 1965), American child actress of the 1970s and '80s

L
Laura Haddock (born 1985), English actress

M
Marcus Haddock (born 1957), American opera singer and voice teacher
Mark Haddock (born 1968), Northern Irish Loyalist paramilitary leader and British Special Branch informer

N
Natalia Margaret Haddock (born 1996), better known as Talia Mar, British singer-songwriter and internet personality.
Neil Haddock (born 1964), Welsh super-featherweight boxing champion
Nicholas Haddock (1686–1746), admiral in the British Royal Navy and Member of Parliament

P
Perry Haddock (born 1959), Australian former rugby league footballer
Peter Haddock (born 1961), English footballer

R
Richard Haddock (c. 1629–1715), Royal Navy admiral and Member of Parliament
Richard Haddock (Royal Navy officer, born 1673), son of the above

W
Walter Haddock (1890–1972), a pioneer Australian rugby league footballer
William F. Haddock (1877–1969), American silent film director

Fictional characters
 Mr. Albert Haddock, a litigant in the works of A. P. Herbert
 Captain Haddock, a cartoon character in The Adventures of Tintin series
 Fanny Haddock, a cook in the radio series Beyond Our Ken and Round the Horne
 Sir Francis Haddock, the ancestor of Captain Haddock in The Adventures of Tintin series
 Hiccup Horrendous Haddock III, in the book and film series How to Train Your Dragon

References